Pulga (Spanish for flea) or La Pulga may refer to:

People
 Lionel Messi (born 1987), Argentine football player, nicknamed "La Pulga"
 Pulga (footballer) (born 1985), Spanish football player
 Enrique González "La Pulga" (1890–1957), Cuban singer-songwriter
 Ivo Pulga (born 1964), Italian football player and coach

Places in the United States
 Pulga, California, an unincorporated community
 Pulga Bridges, California, two bridges on the North Fork Feather River

Other uses
 Bugaboo (The Flea), a 1983 computer game published as La Pulga in Spain

Lists of people by nickname